The Kyrshabakty is a river in southern Kazakhstan.
 
The river flows across Sarysu District of the Zhambyl Region. There are Cambrian limestones by the river that contain a rich variety of trilobites fossils.

Course
The Kyrshabakty river has its source in springs located in the northern slopes of the Karatau Range, near Baizhansai village. Its upper stretch is also known as Bugun and heads roughly northwestwards. Midway along its course it bends northwards. The river flows within a gorge, often with steep sides, all along. Finally the Kyrshabakty ends up in the right bank of the Shabakty, not far from Shabakty Railway Junction. 

There is water in the river all year round.

See also
List of rivers of Kazakhstan

References

External links
Географическая точка Каньон Шабакты 

Rivers of Kazakhstan
Jambyl Region
Endorheic basins of Asia